Credentialism and educational inflation refers to the increasing overqualifications in educational requirements for occupations.

In Western society, China, and India, there has been increasing reliance on formal qualifications or certification for jobs. This process has, in turn, led to credential inflation (also known as credential creep, academic inflation, or degree inflation), the process of inflation of the minimum credentials required for a given job and the simultaneous devaluation of the value of diplomas and degrees. These trends are also associated with grade inflation, a tendency to award progressively higher academic grades for work that would have received lower grades in the past.

There are some occupations that used to require a high school diploma, such as construction supervisors, loans officers, insurance clerks, and executive assistants, that are increasingly requiring a bachelor's degree. Some jobs that formerly required candidates to have a bachelor's degree, such as becoming a director in the federal government, tutoring students, or being a history tour guide in a historic site, now require a master's degree. Some jobs that used to require a master's degree, such as junior scientific researcher positions and sessional lecturer jobs, now require a PhD. Also, some jobs that formerly required only a PhD, such as university professor positions, are increasingly requiring one or more postdoctoral fellowship appointments. Often increased requirements are simply a way to reduce the number of applicants to a position. The increasingly global nature of competitions for high-level positions may also be another cause of credential creep.

Credentialism and professionalization

Credentialism is a reliance on formal qualifications or certifications to determine whether someone is permitted to undertake a task, speak as an expert or work in a certain field. It has also been defined as "excessive reliance on credentials, especially academic degrees, in determining hiring or promotion policies." Credentialism occurs where the credentials for a job or a position are upgraded, even though there is no skill change that makes this increase necessary.

Professionalization is the social process by which any trade or occupation is transformed into a true "profession of the highest integrity and competence". This process tends to involve establishing acceptable qualifications, a professional body or association to oversee the conduct of members of the profession and some degree of demarcation of the qualified from unqualified amateurs. This creates "a hierarchical divide between the knowledge-authorities in the professions and a deferential citizenry." This demarcation is often termed "occupational closure", as it means that the profession then becomes closed to entry from outsiders, amateurs and the unqualified: a stratified occupation "defined by professional demarcation and grade".

Causes

Knowledge economy
The developed world has transitioned from an agricultural economy (pre-1760s) to an industrial economy (1760s – 1900s) to a knowledge economy (late 1900s – present) due to increases in innovation. This latest stage is marked by technological advancement and global competition to produce new products and research. The shift to a knowledge economy, a term coined by Peter Drucker, has led to a decrease in the demand for physical labor (such as that seen during the Industrial Age) and an increase in the demand for intellect. This has caused a multitude of problems to arise. Economists from the Federal Reserve Bank of St. Louis, who categorized jobs as being either routine cognitive, routine manual, nonroutine cognitive or nonroutine manual, have examined a 30 million increase in the number of nonroutine cognitive jobs over the past 30 years, making it the most common job type. These nonroutine cognitive jobs, according to researchers, require "high intellectual skill". This can be rather difficult to measure in potential employees.
Additionally, production outputs differ amongst labor types. The results of manual labor are tangible, whereas the results of knowledge labor are not. Management consultant Fred Nickols identifies an issue with this:

Decreased visibility in the workplace correlates with a greater risk of employees underperforming in cognitive tasks. This, along with the previously mentioned issue of measuring cognitive skill, has resulted in employers requiring credentials, such as college degrees. Matt Sigelman, CEO of a labor market analysis firm, elaborates on why employers such as himself value degrees:

History
Western culture, specifically that in the United States, has experienced a rise in the attractiveness of professions and a decline in the attractiveness of manufacturing and independent business. This shift could be attributed to the class stratification that occurred during the Gilded Age.

The Gilded Age was a period of time marked by a rise in big businesses and globalization, particularly within the construction and oil industries. During the Long Depression, the monopoly trusts dispossessed family and subsistence farmers of their land. This combined with the mechanization of farm work led to mass proletarianization, employers or the self-employed becoming wage laborers, as individuals took jobs working on large projects such as the Transcontinental Railroad. Rapid advancements such as railroad developments and increased use of steamboats to import/export goods made cities such as New York and Chicago convenient places to operate a business, and therefore ideal places to find work. Local business owners had a difficult time competing with the large companies such as Standard Oil and Armour operating out of cities. The ability for people to become entrepreneurs declined, and people began taking underpaying jobs at these companies. This fueled a class divide between the working class and industrialists (also called "robber barons") such as Andrew Carnegie and John Rockefeller.

Attempting to increase the prestige of one's occupation became standard among working class individuals trying to recover from the financial hardships of this time. Unqualified individuals turned to professions such as medicine and law, which had low barriers to entry. Referring to this phenomenon, historian Robert Huddleston Wiebe once commented:

The establishment of legitimized professional certifications began after the turn of the twentieth century when the Carnegie Foundation published reports on medical and law education. One example of such reports is the Flexner Report, written by educator Abraham Flexner.
This research led to the closing of low-quality medical and law schools. The impact of the many unqualified workers of the Gilded age also increased motivation to weed out unqualified workers in other professions. Professionalization increased, and the number of professions and professionals multiplied. There were economic benefits to this because it lowered the competition for jobs by weeding out unqualified candidates, driving up salaries.

The alliance of employers with educational institutions progressed throughout the twentieth century as businesses and technological advancements progressed. Businessmen were unable to keep schedules or accounts in their heads like the small-town merchant had once done. New systems of accounting, organization, and business management were developed. In his book The Visible Hand, Alfred Chandler of Harvard Business School explained that the increase in large corporations with multiple divisions killed off the hybrid owner/managers of simpler times and created a demand for salaried, "scientific" management. The development of professional management societies, research groups, and university business programs began in the early 1900s. By 1910, Harvard and Dartmouth offered graduate business programs and NYU, the University of Chicago, and the University of Pennsylvania offered undergraduate business programs. By the 1960s, nearly half of all managerial jobs formally required either an undergraduate or graduate degree.

Academic inflation
Academic inflation is the contention that an excess of college-educated individuals with lower degrees (associate and bachelor's degrees) and even higher qualifications (master's or doctorate degrees) compete for too few jobs that require these degrees.

Academic inflation occurs when university graduates take up work that was not formerly done by graduates of a certain level, and higher-degree holders continue to migrate to this particular occupation until it eventually becomes a field known as a "graduate profession" and the minimum job requirements have been inflated academically for low-level job tasks.

The institutionalizing of professional education has resulted in fewer and fewer opportunities for young people to work their way up from by "learning on the job". Academic inflation leads employers to put more faith into certificates and diplomas awarded on the basis of other people's assessments.

The term "academic inflation" was popularized by Ken Robinson in his TED Talk entitled "Schools Kill Creativity".

Academic inflation has been analogized to the inflation of paper currencies where too much currency chases too few commodities.

Credential inflation or degree inflation
Credential inflation refers to the devaluation of educational or academic credentials over time and a corresponding decrease in the expected advantage given a degree holder in the job market. Credential inflation is thus similar to price inflation, and describes the declining value of earned certificates and degrees. Credential inflation in the form of increased educational requirements and testing, can also create artificial labor shortages.  

Credential inflation has been recognized as an enduring trend over the past century in Western higher education, and is also known to have occurred in ancient China and Japan, and at Spanish universities of the 17th century.

For instance, in the late 1980s, a bachelor's degree was the standard qualification to enter the profession of physical therapy. By the 1990s, a master's degree was expected. Today, a doctorate is becoming the norm. 

State requirements that registered nurses hold bachelors degrees have also contributed to a nursing shortage.

Indications
A good example of credential inflation is the decline in the value of the US high school diploma since the beginning of the 20th century, when it was held by less than 10 percent of the population. At the time, high school diplomas attested to middle-class respectability and for many years even provided access to managerial level jobs. More recently, however, a high school diploma barely qualifies the graduate for menial service work.

One indicator of credential inflation is the relative decline in the wage differential between those with college degrees and those with only high school diplomas. An additional indicator is the gap between the credentials requested by employers in job postings and the qualifications of those already in those occupations. A 2014 study in the United States found, for example, that 65% of job postings for executive secretaries and executive assistants now call for a bachelor's degree, but only 19% of those currently employed in these roles have a degree. Jobs that were open to high school graduates decades ago now routinely require higher education as well—without an appreciable change in required skills. In some cases, such as IT help desk roles, a study found there was little difference in advertised skill requirements between jobs requiring a college degree and those that do not.

Causes
The causes of credential inflation are controversial, but it is generally thought to be the result of increased access to higher education. This has resulted in entry level jobs requesting a bachelor's (or higher) degree when they were once open to high school graduates. Potential sources of credential inflation include: degree requirements by employers, self-interest of individuals and families, increased standards of living which allow for additional years of education, cultural pushes for being educated, and the availability of federal student loans which allow many more individuals to obtain credentials than could otherwise afford to do so.

In particular, the internal dynamics of credential inflation threaten higher education initiatives around the world because credential inflation appears to operate independently of market demand for credentials.

The push for more Americans to get a higher education rests on the well-evidenced idea that those without a college degree are less employable. Many critics of higher education, in turn, complain that a surplus of college graduates has produced an "employer's market".

Problems 
Credential inflation is a controversial topic. There is very little consensus on how, or if, this type of inflation impacts higher education, the job market, and salaries. Some common concerns discussed in this topic are:

 College tuition and fee increases have been blamed on degree inflation, though the current data do not generally support this assertion.
 Credential-driven students may be less engaged than those who are attending college for personal enrichment.
 Devaluation of other forms of learning.
 Opportunity costs of attending graduate school, which can include delayed savings, less years in work force (and less earnings), and postponement of starting families.
 Lack of adequately trained faculty and rises in the number of adjunct professors which can adversely impact quality of education.
 Grade inflation has been correlated to degree inflation by some academics, though the causal direction is debated.
 Some have accused degree inflation of devaluating job and employment experience, though most data show that degrees are not as highly sought after as relevant experience, which is the cited reason for student loan debt that cannot be paid back.

Grade inflation

Grade inflation is the tendency to award progressively higher academic grades for work that would have received lower grades in the past. It is frequently discussed in relation to education in the United States, and to GCSEs and A levels in England and Wales. It is also discussed as an issue in Canada and many other nations, especially Australia and New Zealand.

See also
Credentialism

Academic inflation
 Digital Taylorism
 Education economics
 Open admissions
 Widening participation

Degree inflation
Affirmative action
Class rank
Dumbing down
Flynn effect
Latin honors
Salutatorian
Valedictorian

Economics
Fallacy of composition
Occupational licensing
Overqualification

References

Further reading 

 Berg, I. (1970). Education and Jobs: The Great Training Robbery. Praeger: New York
 Brown, D. (2001) "The Social Sources of Educational Credentialism: Status Cultures, Labour Markets and Organisations". Sociology of Education Extra Issue 2001; 19–34. 
 Tony Buon & Compton, R. (1990). "Credentials, Credentialism and Employee Selection". Asia Pacific Human Resource Management. 28, 126–132.
 Tony Buon (1994). "The Recruitment of Training Professionals". Training & Development in Australia. 21, (5), 17-22
 Caplan, B. (2018). The Case Against Education: Why the Education System Is a Waste of Time and Money. Princeton University Press.
 Randall Collins, "Functional and Conflict Theories of Educational Stratification", American Sociological Review, Vol. 36, No. 6. (Dec., 1971), pp. 1002-1019 (for the earliest discussion of how credential inflation operates, see 1015-1016). https://www.suz.uzh.ch/dam/jcr:00000000-510b-31c0-0000-000011824966/11.02-collins-71.pdf
 Randall Collins, The Credential Society: An Historical Sociology of Education and Stratification, Academic Press, 1979/2019.
 Ronald Dore (1976) "The Diploma Disease: Education, Qualification, and Development"
 Charles D. Hayes, Proving You're Qualified: Strategies for Competent People without College Degrees, Autodidactic Press, 1995.
 Charles Derber, William A. Schwartz, Yale Magrass, Power in the Highest Degree: Professionals and the Rise of a New Mandarin Order, Oxford University Press, 1990.
 John McKnight, The Careless Society: Community and Its Counterfeits, New York, BasicBooks, 1995.
 
 Robert S. Mendelsohn, Confessions of a Medical Heretic, Chicago: Contemporary books, 1979.
 Ivan Illich, Irving K. Zola, John McKnight, Disabling Professions, 1977.
 Ivan Illich, Deschooling Society, 1971.
 Woodward, Orrin & Oliver DeMille LeaderShift: A Call for Americans to Finally Stand Up & Lead Grand Central Publishing 2013
 Sarah Kendzior (2014), "College is a promise the economy does not keep" (Al Jazeera)

External links

Credential inflation
 Gary North, The PhD Glut Revisited, 24 January 2006 
 Randall Collins, The Dirty Little Secret of Credential Inflation, The Chronicle of Higher Education, 27 September 2002, Volume 49, Issue 5, Page B20 
 Randall Collins, "Functional and Conflict Theories of Educational Stratification", American Sociological Review, Vol. 36, No. 6. (Dec., 1971), pp. 1002-1019 (for the earliest discussion of how credential inflation operates, see 1015-1016). 
 Randall Collins, The Credential Society. New York: Academic Press, 1979, pp. 191–204. 
 Lowell Gallaway, The Supreme Court and the Inflation of Educational Credentials: Impact of Griggs examined. Clarion Call, 9 November 2006 
 Laura Pappano "The Masters as the New Bachelor's" (New York Times, 22 July 2011), link
 Joseph B. Fuller & Manjari Raman et al. (October 2017). "Dismissed by Degrees: How degree inflation is undermining U.S. competitiveness and hurting America's middle class". Accenture, Grads of Life & Harvard Business School.

Academic inflation
 The Master's as the New Bachelor's
 Sir Ken Robinson: Do schools kill creativity?

Grade inflation
 Grade Inflation At American Colleges and Universities

 Alfie Kohn: The Dangerous Myth of Grade Inflation
 Steven Landsburg: Grade Expectations: Why grade inflation is bad for schools--and what to do about it.
 Grade Inflation Sources

 Grade Inflation, Ethics and Engineering Education
 A's for Everyone! (The Washington Post article written by Alicia Shepard)
 Nominal GPA and Real GPA: A Simple Adjustment that Compensates for Grade Inflation
 Real GPA and Real SET: Two Antidotes to Greed, Sloth, and Cowardice in the College Classroom

Education issues
Student assessment and evaluation
Waste of resources